Peter Lamb (9 June 1925 – 11 July 1978) was a Scottish professional footballer who played as a right back.

Career
Lamb played for St Anthony's, before signing to Celtic for one season from 1946 to 1947, and then played for Alloa Athletic from 1947 to 1949.

Personal life and death
Lamb was born in New Monkland on 9 June 1925. He married Bridget Gallagher, who predeceased him. After his football career, he worked as an electrician. Lamb died from lung cancer in Alloa on 11 July 1978, at the age of 53.

References

1925 births
1978 deaths
Alloa Athletic F.C. players
Association football fullbacks
Celtic F.C. players
Scottish Football League players
Scottish footballers
St Anthony's F.C. players